Tom or Thomas Higham may refer to:
Tom Higham (rugby league), player for the Sydney Roosters in 1966
Tom Higham, half of Aquilo, UK music duo
Tom Higham, designer of Triumph Bonneville T140D Special motorbike
Thomas Higham (archaeologist), Oxford-based academic who worked on Red Lady of Paviland and Ban Chiang
Thomas Higham, 18th-century squire of Cold Higham, Northamptonshire, England